The Zarai Taraqiati Bank Limited cricket team, formerly known as Agriculture Development Bank of Pakistan cricket team, was a first-class cricket side in Pakistan. It was sponsored by the Zarai Taraqiati Bank Limited. In May 2019, Pakistan's Prime Minister Imran Khan revamped the domestic cricket structure in Pakistan, excluding departmental teams like Zarai Taraqiati Bank Limited in favour of regional sides. The Pakistan Cricket Board (PCB) was criticised in removing departmental sides, with players voicing their concern to revive the teams.

Playing history
As the Agriculture Development Bank of Pakistan they played 148 first-class matches from 1985–86 to 2001–02, with 45 wins, 26 losses and 77 draws. When the bank changed its name and structure in 2002, the team also changed its name, beginning with the 2002–03 season, to Zarai Taraqiati Bank Limited. Under the name Zarai Taraqiati Bank Limited, they played 267 matches, with 86 wins, 68 losses and 113 draws.

In April 2018, they won the Patron's Trophy Grade-II tournament to qualify for the 2018–19 Quaid-e-Azam Trophy. They won their opening match of the tournament, against Lahore Blues, by 151 runs. However, they finished bottom in their group, and were relegated back to the second-tier for the next season. They also finished bottom of their group in the 2018–19 Quaid-e-Azam One Day Cup, winning just one of their seven games.

Squad
The following players took part in the Patron's Trophy (Grade II) 2017/18 final:

 Saadullah Ghauri
 Shakeel Ansar
 Mohsin Nadeem
 Waqas Saleem
 Aqib Shah
 Usman Ashraf
 Saad Nasim
 Raza Ali Dar
 Bilawal Iqbal
 Hamza Nadeem
 Mohammad Ali

Honours
 Quaid-e-Azam (1)
 1988–89
 Patron's Trophy (3)
 1990–91
 1993–94
 1995–96

See also
 Pakistan Cricket Board
 List of Zarai Taraqiati Bank Limited cricketers

References

External links
 Cricinfo
 Lists of matches played by Zarai Taraqiati Bank Limited
 Lists of matches played by Agriculture Development Bank of Pakistan

1985 establishments in Pakistan
Pakistani first-class cricket teams
Cricket clubs established in 1985